The Henry B. Miller House is house located in northeast Portland, Oregon listed on the National Register of Historic Places. It was built in 1911 and designed by Ellis F. Lawrence.

See also
 National Register of Historic Places listings in Northeast Portland, Oregon

References

1911 establishments in Oregon
Houses completed in 1911
Houses on the National Register of Historic Places in Portland, Oregon
Irvington, Portland, Oregon
Portland Historic Landmarks
Tudor Revival architecture in Oregon